NCSE may refer to:

Cognistat, formerly known as the Neurobehavioral Cognitive Status Examination (NCSE), a cognitive screening test
National Center for Science Education, which promotes the teaching of evolutionary biology and climate science K-12 and above
National Council for Science and the Environment, a business-research alliance for environmental policy